The following tables list the terms of all Maine Supreme Judicial Court justices in their order of appointment to serve on the Court.

Chief justices

Associate justices

Active retired justices
Retired justices who have been reappointed to enable them to continue to take part in Supreme Judicial Court proceedings.

See also
Maine Supreme Judicial Court

External links
Maine Supreme Judicial Court Chronological List
Maine Supreme Judicial Court official website
The Supreme Judicial Court of the State of Maine, 1820 to 2009 - Cleaves Law Library
Maine Supreme Court Chief and Associate Justices - Maine State Legislature

Maine Supreme Judicial Court

Justices of the Maine Supreme Judicial Court
Maine